Hrvatsko Selo is a village in Croatian municipality of Topusko.

References

Populated places in Sisak-Moslavina County